The Men's 4 x 400 metres relay event  at the 2006 IAAF World Indoor Championships was held on March 12.

Medalists

* Runners who participated in the heats only and received medals.

Results

Heats

Qualification: First 2 teams of each heat (Q) plus the next 2 fastest (q) advance to the final. The heats were started at 10:41.

Final
The final was started at 17:55 on March 12.

References

400
4 × 400 metres relay at the World Athletics Indoor Championships